Taalabaya, is a village located in the Zahlé District of the Beqaa Governorate in Lebanon.

History
In 1838, Eli Smith noted Tha'labaya as a Sunni Muslim, Maronite and Christian village in the Beqaa Valley.

The town of Taalabaya was attacked by PLA insurgents during the Lebanese Civil War; 35 residents were killed.

References

Bibliography

External links
Taalabaya, localiban

Populated places in Zahlé District
Sunni Muslim communities in Lebanon
Maronite Christian communities in Lebanon